Mauno Tarkiainen (18 August 1904 – 8 December 1971) was a Finnish long-distance runner. He competed in the marathon at the 1936 Summer Olympics.

References

External links
 

1904 births
1971 deaths
Athletes (track and field) at the 1936 Summer Olympics
Finnish male long-distance runners
Finnish male marathon runners
Olympic athletes of Finland
Sportspeople from South Savo